Bagohouo is a town in western Ivory Coast. It is a sub-prefecture of Duékoué Department in Guémon Region, Montagnes District.

Bagohouo was a commune until March 2012, when it became one of 1126 communes nationwide that were abolished.

In 2014, the population of the sub-prefecture of Bagohouo was 46,129.

Villages
The 11 villages of the sub-prefecture of Bagohouo and their population in 2014 are:

Notes

Sub-prefectures of Guémon
Former communes of Ivory Coast